The Embry Chapel Church, at 117 Mulberry St. in Elizabethtown, Kentucky, was built in 1868 to serve the Second Presbyterian Church, and was sold in 1891 to an African Methodist Episcopal congregation which had formed in 1865.  It was listed on the National Register of Historic Places in 1988.

It is a one-story brick church built with Romanesque Revival style.  It has a square bell tower rising from the center of its front facade, with the original arched entrance and brick corbels.  Stained glass windows are recessed in brick bays separated by pilasters.  There is a c.1970 one-story frame addition at the rear.

References

African Methodist Episcopal churches in Kentucky
National Register of Historic Places in Hardin County, Kentucky
Romanesque Revival architecture in Kentucky
Churches completed in 1868
Elizabethtown, Kentucky
Churches on the National Register of Historic Places in Kentucky
Churches in Hardin County, Kentucky
1868 establishments in Kentucky